Archibald Jackson (25 January 1901 – 11 November 1985) was an English professional footballer who played as a centre-half for Sunderland.

Born in England but raised in Scotland, his father Jimmy, elder brother James, uncle Andrew and cousin Andy were all footballers;  another cousin was Australian cricketer Archie Jackson.

References

1901 births
1985 deaths
Footballers from Plumstead
English footballers
Association football defenders
Rutherglen Glencairn F.C. players
Sunderland A.F.C. players
Southend United F.C. players
Third Lanark A.C. players
Chester City F.C. players
Tranmere Rovers F.C. players
Accrington Stanley F.C. players
Walsall F.C. players
Southport F.C. players
Northwich Victoria F.C. players
Manchester North End F.C. players
Rossendale United F.C. players
English Football League players
Scottish Football League players
Scottish Junior Football Association players
Anglo-Scots